The smoky bat (Amorphochilus schnablii) is a species of bat in the family Furipteridae. It is the only species within the genus Amorphochilus. Its natural habitat is rocky shores.

It is also called the thumbless bat because its thumb is partly enclosed in its wing; this common name is also applied to another species, Furipterus horrens. They lives in western Peru, western Ecuador, Puna island (Ecuador) and northern Chile. and can be found in groups of up to 300 bats. In 2013, Bat Conservation International listed this species as one of the 35 species of its worldwide priority list of conservation.

Smoky bats are nocturnal and insectivorous animals that like to fly very close to the ground to catch their prey. They roost in hidden areas such as small crevices.

References

Bats of South America
Furipteridae
Mammals of Chile
Mammals of Ecuador
Mammals of Peru
Mammals described in 1877
Taxa named by Wilhelm Peters
Endangered animals
Endangered biota of South America
Taxonomy articles created by Polbot